George Kisevalter (April 4, 1910 – October 1, 1997) was an American operations officer of the CIA, who handled Major Pyotr Popov, the first Soviet GRU officer run by the CIA. He had some involvement with Soviet intelligence Colonel Oleg Penkovsky, active in the 1960s, who had more direct relations with British MI-6.

Early life 
George Kisevalter was born on 4 April 1910, in St. Petersburg, Russian Empire, the son of an Imperial Russian Army munitions expert and his wife, and grandson of a Russian deputy finance minister.

In 1915, Kisevalter's father, accompanied by his family, was sent to the United States in order to purchase weapons for the Russian military. They were still out of the Russian Empire on this extensive trip when the Bolshevik Revolution occurred two years later. The Kisevalters remained in the United States. There they eventually became naturalized and settled in New York City, where there developed a sizeable Russian emigre community. The young George attended Stuyvesant High School.

Education 
In 1926 Kisevalter attended Dartmouth College to study engineering. Among his classmates was Nelson Rockefeller.

Career

Military 
Kisevalter spent much of World War II as an army officer involved in supporting the Soviet war effort through the Lend-Lease program. His first experience with intelligence came in 1944 when, as a fluent Russian speaker, he was assigned to military intelligence in order to work on Soviet intelligence projects. Due to Kisevalter's growing expertise in Soviet matters, as well as his German language skill, he was one of the officers who interviewed Major General Reinhard Gehlen, after Gehlen had surrendered to the US military. Gehlen had been Nazi Germany's chief of intelligence for the Eastern Front, and was also well versed in Soviet military and political affairs.

Military Intelligence 
Kisevalter had a brief civilian career before joining the CIA, which was the civilian foreign intelligence service of the United States federal government. By 1953, Kisevalter was a branch chief in the Soviet Division of the Directorate of Operations. That year Major Pyotr Semyonovich Popov of GRU, the foreign military intelligence agency of the Soviet Army, contacted American intelligence in Vienna, Austria, and offered to spy for the United States.

Kisevalter was selected as Popov's handler, and spent the next five years in Vienna handling Popov, who provided the United States with detailed information on Soviet military plans and capabilities. During the period when he spied for the United States, Popov was considered to be "the CIA's most important agent."  He was arrested by the Soviets and subsequently executed in 1959.

In 1961, Kisevalter was assigned to handle another GRU member, Colonel Oleg Penkovsky, who had also volunteered to spy. For almost two years Kisevalter and the British Secret Intelligence Service (MI-6) jointly handled Penkovsky, who provided them with vital information on Soviet missile capabilities. Penkovsky's information was critical to the resolution of the Cuban Missile Crisis. In October 1962, Penkovsky and his British courier, Greville Wynne, were arrested by the Soviet KGB and convicted of espionage. Penkovsky was executed in 1963.

Kisevalter continued to be involved in agent recruitment and handling, including the case of KGB walk-in Yuri Nosenko, whom he helped Nosenko's recruiter and long-term handler, Russian-speaking CIA officer Tennent H. "Pete" Bagley, interview five times when Nosenko walked in to CIA in Geneva, Switzerland, in late May, 1962. He also briefly dealt with KGB walk-in Anatoliy Golitsyn when Golitsyn defected to the U.S. in December 1961. The curiously overlapping-but-contradictory information from Golitsyn and Nosenko (who worked in different departments of the highly compartmentalized KGB) helped to precipitate a mole hunt by the CIA's counterintelligence chief, James Jesus Angleton. Golitsyn claimed that Yuri Nosenko was a KGB plant, which led to Nosenko's incarceration and harsh interrogation for about three years. Kisevalter apparently "never accepted the case for a mole in the CIA or the argument that Nosenko was planted by the KGB".

Kisevalter's final assignment before his retirement in 1970 was training new CIA operations officers. He received the CIA's highest award, the Distinguished Intelligence Medal. In 1997, when the CIA celebrated its 50th anniversary, Kisevalter was designated as one of its 50 Trailblazers.

Kisevalter was featured in William Hood's 'skilful spy novel', Mole (1983), a presumed fictional account of the Popov operation, as the case officer Gregory Domnin. According to Clarence Ashley, his friend and biographer, Kisevalter came up with that pseudonym for Hood based on his great-grandmother's maiden name, Domnina.

Personal life 
In October 1997, Kisevalter died. Kisevalter is buried at Arlington National Cemetery.

See also 
 Oleg Penkovsky
 Anatoliy Golitsyn
 James Jesus Angleton

References 

1910 births
1997 deaths
People of the Central Intelligence Agency
Stuyvesant High School alumni
Burials at Arlington National Cemetery
Emigrants from the Russian Empire to the United States
Recipients of the Distinguished Intelligence Medal